Pakhli Sultanate was an ancient sarkar (district) of the Mughal Subah of Punjab, now part of Hazara, Pakistan. and it was named after Sultan Pakhal Swati. It roughly corresponds to the ancient Urasa, the Aρσa or Οΰaρσa, which Ptolemy placed between the Bidaspes (Jhelum River) and the Indus River.
It was  part of the Gandhara or Gandharva country of antiquity. It later became part of Chandragupta Maurya's empire. The archaeological remains found here suggest that this was a place of great Buddhist learning.
In the Rajatarangini this place appeared as a separate kingdom and then again as tributary to the Kashmir valley. The Ain-i-Akbari refers to this entire region as Sarkar Pakhli, which formed a part of the larger Kashmir province, which in turn was part of Subah Kabul. The area of Pakhli today forms a part of the Mansehra of the Khyber-Pakhtunkhwa province of Pakistan.

History
The king of Pakhli at the time of Alexander the Great was Arsakes; when the Chinese pilgrim Xuanzang visited the area it was a tributary of Kashmir. The area was named after Sultan Pakhal, the elder brother of Sultan Behram, who conquered all the area from Jalalabad to Kashmir from Hindus. His rule didn't last long, as he died very young.
According to the Kashmir chronicle Rajatarangini, the area was now a separate kingdom and a tributary to the Kashmir state. In it lay Agror, the ancient Atyugrapura. In Babar's time this tract was held by the Karluk Turks . In the Ain-i-Akbari it is described as bounded on the east by Kashmir, on the south by the country of the Gakhars, on the west by Attock, and on the north by Kator (Chitral). Under Durrani rule Saadat Khan was chosen as chief of Pakhli, then a dependency of Kashmir. He founded the fort of Garhi Saadat Khan, which was the headquarters of Azad Khan's rebellion against Timur Shah. Its main city was once Agror, the ancient Atyugrapura. Swat. Early in the nineteenth century Pakhli comprised three districts: Mansehra in the south and south-east, Shinkiari (subdivided into Kandhi and Maidan) in the north-east, and Bhir-Kand in the centre. The valleys of Kagan, Bhogarmang, and Agror were dependent on it.

Mughal Era
Pakhli Sarkar was the only state in Mughal Empire which was exempted from any tax payments to Delhi. During Akbar's era, Sultan Hussain Khan of Pakhli revolted against him on the basis that the Delhi Sultanate was interfering into Pakhli's internal affairs. Akbar defeated him, but restored him in his position later on.

Decline and fall of Karlugh Turks and arrival of Swatis

During the entire period of Mughal ascendancy in Indian sub-continent, Mughals acknowledged Karlughs as the rulers of  Cis Indus Pakhli Sarkar. Sultan Maqarrab revolted against his own brother Sultan Mehmud Khurd, but was defeated by the Sultan due to intervention from the Delhi Sultanate  Karlugh Turks had by that time had weakened enough to be overthrown by Swatis who established their rule in the plains of Pakhli and mountains of Kaghan valley These areas were then divided between Swati and Syeds. The region of Mansehra was handed over to the Swati The Kaghan valley was given to the Syeds and Oghi  was delivered to Ali Sheris and different Swati clans including Khankhails( An adopted Clan by Swatis)  Swatis had old claim in Pakhli as it was conquered by their ancestor Jahangiri Sultan Pakhal of Nangrahar during Ghori times. Jadoons from Swabi subjugated the Rash areas. Sultan Qyas-ud-din, younger brother of Sultan Mehmud, was the Waali (Governor) of  what is now Tanawal. In Tanawal areas, Karlugh Turks retained their power for another 90 years But were restricted to a small area of lower Tanawal from Sherwan (Abbottabad) to Behali (Mansehra).

The Sikhs
In the early nineteenth century, Pakhli formed part of the Kingdom of Kabul (modern day Afghanistan) and through it ran the high road connecting Kabul to Kashmir. In 1813, the Afghans lost the strategically placed Fort of Attock (on the left bank of the Indus) to the Sikhs under Maharaja Ranjit Singh. The tribute due from the lower regions of Pakhli, formerly collected by the Afghan Governor of Attock, now became due to the Sikhs. In 1819, when the Sikhs wrested Kashmir from the Afghans, the tribute due from the upper reaches of Pakhli also became due to them. Numerous attempts to collect tribute from the lower parts of Hazara not only met with failure, but also the loss of prominent Sikh administrators and commanders.

In 1822, Maharaja Ranjit Singh granted both Pakhli and Damtaur as a jagir to Hari Singh Nalwa as a reward for his remarkable success in the Kashmir mountains. As soon as Hari Singh received Pakhli and Damtaur in jagir, he built the famous town of Haripur in the heart of the plains of Hazara. This fortified township has grown over the last 175 years into the Haripur District (Pakistan). The ruins of several forts built by this indomitable Sikh general continue to dot the landscape of Pakhli, which continued as Hari Singh Nalwa's jagir till his death in 1837. It was after him that this entire region came to be known as Hazara.

Descendants

Descendants of the Karlugh Turks still live in Behali Mansehra, Abbottabad and Haripur and Azad Kashmir and Descendants of Sultan Behram and Sultan Pakhal are living in District Mansehra , Battagram and Swat

References 

Mansehra District